Lola Dewaere, also known as Lola Céleste Marie Bourdeaux (born 4 December 1979 in Boulogne-Billancourt, Hauts-de-Seine), is a French actor well known for her portrayal of the resourceful and empathetic police commander Raphaëlle Coste in the television series Astrid et Raphaëlle — broadcast in the United States by PBS under the title Astrid — alongside Sara Mortensen, the trilingual actor who portrays Astrid, an autistic and brilliantly innovative criminologist.

Early Life
Lola Dewaere is the daughter of the late actor Patrick Dewaere  and Élisabeth “Elsa” Malvina Chalier. She is also the half-sister of Angèle Herry-Leclerc, born in 1974 to Dewaere and the actress Miou-Miou.

After her father — heavily indebted as a consequence of his drug addiction — committed suicide in his Paris house in 1982, his widow, “Elsa” Chalier, needing to work to help discharge the debts of the estate, entrusted the three-year-old Lola into the care of her maternal grandparents, residing in Saint-Lambert-du-Lattay, Maine-et-Loire. After a somewhat difficult period of elementary school, she returned to live with her mother in Paris and continued her education at a private Catholic school, Saint-Michel-de-Picpus, from which she was expelled because of her rebellious attitude and refusal to accept authority.

Biography
Around the age of 16, she says, she discovered several of her father's films, including Adieu Poulet (The French Detective, 1975), La Meilleure Façon de marcher (“The Best Way to Walk,” 1976), Coup de tête (“Hothead,” 1979), and Psy (1981), which she said she liked. In 1997, when she turned 18, she enrolled at the French drama school Cours Florent to train as an actor. After a serious car accident in 2001, she began working for the women's magazine Jalouse, later working in real estate. In 2007, she began her career as an actor.

In March 2010, Myriam Boyer secured her a role in La Vie avant soi, a television adaptation of Romain Gary's novel of the same name, published in English as The Life Before Us. In the summer of 2010, she accepted the lead role in Antoine Beauville's drama La Biscotte at Théâtre le Temple (now known as Apollo Théâtre) in Paris. The following year, actor-director Charlotte de Turckheim chose her to portray a main character in the comedy Mince Alors! (Big Is Beautiful, 2012) alongside Victoria Abril. The film was a popular success. The same year, she portrayed Marie-Lou, the cruise director in La Croisière, a six-episode series set aboard a cruise ship; the series was broadcast in both Switzerland (RTS1) and France (TF1) in 2013.

Theatre

Filmography

References

External links

French film actresses
21st-century French actresses
Actresses from Paris
Living people
1979 births
Cours Florent alumni